Imaginate is the debut album by Australian rock band Taxiride. It was recorded in Ocean Way Studios in Los Angeles and produced by Jack Joseph Puig. Imaginate reached number one on the ARIA Albums Chart and was certified double platinum. Its first two singles, "Get Set" and "Everywhere You Go", both peaked in the top 15 on the related ARIA Singles Chart. At the ARIA Music Awards of 1999 Taxiride won Breakthrough Artist – Single for "Get Set". In the following year Imaginate was nominated for the related category, Breakthrough Artist – Album.

Track listing
 "Can You Feel" – 3:17 
 "Get Set" – 3:13 
 "Everywhere You Go" – 3:37 
 "72 Hour Daze" – 4:50 
 "Rocketship" – 3:40 
 "Let Me Die Young" – 4:26 
 "Rachael" – 3:00 
 "Ice Cream" – 3:29 
 "Let's Spend the Night" – 2:45 
 "Nothing in This World" – 3:27 
 "Counting Down the Days" – 2:41 
 "Back Again" – 1:28

Australian/European/Taiwanese releases
 "Helplessly Hoping" (from the film A Walk on the Moon)

Japanese release
 "Helplessly Hoping" (from the film A Walk on the Moon)
 "Get Set" (Original Demo Version)

Release history

Chart positions

Weekly charts

Year-end charts

Certification

References

External links
 Taxiride official site

1999 albums
Taxiride albums